Mahmoud Muaaz  (born 26 October 1984) is a Saudi professional footballer who currently plays for Al-Ansar as a defender.

Honours
Al-Ahli
King Cup: 2011, 2012

Al-Wehda
Prince Mohammad bin Salman League: 2017–18

References

 

1984 births
Living people
Saudi Arabian footballers
Al-Ansar FC (Medina) players
Al-Ahli Saudi FC players
Al-Faisaly FC players
Najran SC players
Al-Taawoun FC players
Al-Wehda Club (Mecca) players
Al-Bukayriyah FC players
Saudi First Division League players
Saudi Professional League players
Saudi Second Division players
Association football defenders